Herron may refer to:

People
Herron (name)
  (Herron is a Scottish surname originating in Stirlingshire and Perthshire, Scotland. First recorded in the Early Middle Ages, the name describes a tall fin man resembling to a Heron Bird.

Places
Herron, Western Australia, Australia
Herron, Michigan, USA
Herron, Montana, USA
 Herrön, Nynäshamn Municipality – an island in the Stockholm archipelago and Nynäshamn Municipality, Stockholm County, Sweden
  – an island and settlement in Karlstad Municipality, Värmland County, Sweden
Herron Island, an island in central Case Inlet, Washington, U.S.A.
Herron Run, a creek in West Virginia, U.S.A.
Herron River, a river in Alaska, U.S.A.
Herron Glacier, a glacier in Alaska, U.S.A.

Facilities and structures
Herron Airport (FAA id: 7G1), New Cumberland, West Virginia, U.S.A.
Herron station, an East Busway station on Herron Avenue, in Pittsburgh, Pennsylvania, U.S.A.
Herron High School in Indianapolis, Indiana, USA
Herron School of Art at the Indiana University–Purdue University Indianapolis, Indianapolis, Indiana, USA
CHSLD Herron, a long-term care facility for the elderly in Dorval, Montreal, Quebec, Canada

Other uses
Herron Pharmaceuticals, an Australian manufacturer of pharmaceutical products
The Herron II; Koufos v C Czarnikow Ltd (1969), an English contract law case

See also

Herrön (disambiguation)
Herron's Mills, Ontario, Canada
Herrons Corners, Ontario, Canada
Herron-Morton Place Historic District in downtown Indianapolis, Indiana, USA
The Herron Arch 1 (public art) a sculpture by James Wille Faust in Indiana University–Purdue University Indianapolis, Indianapolis, Indiana, USA
, a U.S. Coast Guard clipper
 
 
Heron (disambiguation)
Harron (surname)